La Roca del Vallès is a village in the comarca of Vallès Oriental in the province of Barcelona and Catalonia.

Notable people
Salvador Illa (born 1966), Spanish Minister of Health and former mayor of La Roca

References

External links
 Government data pages 

Municipalities in Vallès Oriental